Yau Ching is a writer, independent film and videomaker and media installation artist. She was born and raised in Hong Kong and educated in Hong Kong, New York City and London.

Work

Bibliography 
Her books include: 
Stripping pants (Chun Hung Press, 1999) 
Building a new stove (Youth Literary Press, 1996)
The impossible home (2000)
Ho Yuk – Let's Love Hong Kong: Script and Critical Essays (2002)
Filming Margins: Tang Shu Shuen, a Forgotten Hong Kong Woman Director (2004)
Sexing Shadows: Gender and Sexuality in Hong Kong Cinema (2006)
Sexual Politics (ed.) (2006) 
As Normal as Possible: Negotiating Sexuality and Gender In Mainland China and Hong Kong (ed.). (2010)
Big Hairy Egg (2011)
I Never Promised You a Rose Garden: Hong Kong Cultural Critique (2014)
Shadow Beings (2015), You Yu Yi: Yau Ching's Critical Writings on Art (2015) 
Yau Ching's Critical Writings on Film 1987-2016 (2017)

Filmography and visual art 
Films and video works include: 
Is There Anything Specific You Want Me to Tell You About? (1990)
Flow (1993), The Ideal / Na(rra)tion (1993)
Video Letters 1-3 (1993-4)
Diasporama: Dead Air (1997)
June 30, 1997 (aka Celebrate What?) (1997)
Finding Oneself (commissioned by Radio Television Hong Kong) (2000) 
Ho Yuk (Let's Love Hong Kong) (2002) 
In My Father’s House, There are Many Mansions (2004)
We Are Alive (2010)

Ho Yuk - Let's Love Hong Kong won the Critic's Grand Prize for Fiction at the 2002 Figueira da Foz International Film Festival.

References

External links 
 Website

Hong Kong film directors
Hong Kong writers
Year of birth missing (living people)
Living people